Suhairi Sabri (born 23 April 1996 in Singapore) is a Singaporean footballer who now plays for Yishun Sentek Mariners in his home country.

Career

Sabri started his senior career with Warriors. In 2017, he signed for Lion City Sailors in the Singapore Premier League, where he made thirteen appearances and scored zero goals. After that, he played for Tanjong Pagar United, where he now plays.

References

External links

 Right place, right time for late bloomer Suhairi Sabri

Tanjong Pagar United FC players
Home United FC players
Warriors FC players
1996 births
Living people
Singaporean footballers
Association football midfielders